Sithambarampillai Thurairaja, PC is a Sri Lankan lawyer and a sitting Puisne Justice of the Supreme Court of Sri Lanka. He was formerly a Justice of the Court of Appeal of Sri Lanka and High Court of Fiji.

Early life
Thurairaja was educated at Saraswathy Maha Vidyalayam in Pussellawa and St. Anthony's College, Kandy. He has a Bachelor of Laws degree from the University of Colombo and a Master of Laws degree from the University of London. He also holds diplomas in forensic medicine, business information technology and computer appliances.

Career
Thurairaja qualified as an attorney-at-law in 1988 and joined the Attorney General's Department in 1989. He rose up the ranks to become Senior State Counsel, Deputy Solicitor General and Additional Solicitor General. He was a high court judge in Fiji. He was appointed President's Counsel in 2016.

Thurairaja was appointed to the Court of Appeal in September 2016, becoming the first Indian Tamil to be appointed to the court. In October 2018 the Constitutional Council recommended that Thurairaja be appointed to the Supreme Court. President Maithripala Sirisena refused to follow the recommendation and suggested alternative names but in January 2019 the Constitutional Council reconfirmed its recommendation of Thurairaja. He was sworn in as a justice of the Supreme Court on 9 January 2019.

References

Alumni of St. Anthony's College, Kandy
Alumni of the University of Colombo
Alumni of the University of London
Court of Appeal of Sri Lanka judges
Indian Tamil lawyers of Sri Lanka
Indian Tamil judges of Sri Lanka
Living people
President's Counsels (Sri Lanka)
Puisne Justices of the Supreme Court of Sri Lanka
Sri Lankan judges on the courts of Fiji
Year of birth missing (living people)